V. R. Rajagopal, known professionally as Kuladeivam Rajagopal, was an Indian actor and comedian who worked predominantly in Tamil films and plays. He was a popular in the 1950s and 1960s. Rajagopal made his film debut in Kaveri (1955). He acted in more than 200 films in five decades. Rajagopal got a title 'Chinna Kalaivanar' Madurai fans presented to him in 1961. He was an admirer of 'Kalaivanar' N. S. Krishnan.

Early career 
Rajagopal was born in Kandramanickam, a small town in Sivagangai district. Father Veerasamy  Naidu and Mother Deivani Ammal The Father Village Bhagavathar and Building Stackcher. He started acting in Terukkuttu from an early age and joined the Boys Theater Company in trichy at the age of 12. He joined the Kalamani Theater Company in Madurai at the age of 16. On a trip to Salem, Rajagopal met N. S. Krishnan, who became close to him. Rajagopal later joined Krishnan's theatrical company.

Film career 
Rajagopal made his film debut in Pudhu Vazhvu which was produced and directed by M. K. Thyagaraja Bhagavathar. As the film was delayed, Rajagopal acted in the Nalla Kaalam movie directed by K.Vembu in 1954. In 1955, Rajagopal acted in Padmini Pictures's Mudhal Thethi and Krishna Pictures's Kaveri. In 1956, Rajagopal acted one of the four heroes in the film Kula Deivam. Rajagopal was named after the success of the film with the title of Kula Deivam. He left the film industry after starring in films in the late 1970s and early '80s.

Death 
Rajagopal died of illness Cardiac Arrest in heart,  on 30 October 1992. His son V. R. Sambath Selvam worked as an Indian Tamil cine music composer.

Filmography 
This is a partial filmography. You can expand it.

1950s

1960s

1970s

1980s

1990s

References

External links 
 https://www.imdb.com/name/nm8366859/

1992 deaths
Indian male film actors
Male actors in Tamil cinema
Indian male comedians
Tamil comedians